Light transport theory deals with the mathematics behind calculating the energy transfers between media that affect visibility. This article is currently specific to light transport in rendering processes such as global illumination and HDRI.

Light

Light Transport 
The amount of light transported is measured by flux density, or luminous flux per unit area on the point of the surface at which it is measured.

Radiometry

Energy Transfer

Media

Models

Hemisphere
Given a surface S, a hemisphere H can be projected on to S to calculate the amount of incoming and outgoing light. If a point P is selected at random on the surface S, the amount of incoming and outgoing light can be calculated by its projection onto the hemisphere.

Hemicube
The hemicube model works in a similar way that the hemisphere model works, with the exception that a hemicube is projected as opposed to a hemisphere. The similarity is only in concept, the actual calculation done by integration has a different form factor.

Particle

Wave

Equations

Maxwell's Equations

Rendering

Rendering converts a model into an image either by simulating a method such as light transport to get physically based photorealistic images, or by applying some kind of style as non-photorealistic rendering.  The two basic operations in light transport are transport (how much light gets from one place to another) and scattering (how surfaces interact with light).

See also
 Path Tracing
Global illumination
 Monte Carlo Method
 Photon mapping
 Radiosity (computer graphics)
 Ray tracing (graphics)
 Ray tracing (physics)
 Reyes rendering

3D computer graphics